Jay Truax (born Lynwood, California) is a bass player and singer with Love Song, a pioneer Christian rock group. Jay formed a Salt Lake City rock group with John Mehler and Fred Field called Spirit of Creation. Later he joined with Chuck Girard and Tommy Coomes in Love Song.

Truax also played bass and sang backing vocals for former Buffalo Springfield member Richie Furay between 1975 and 1977 and played on Furay's 1976 album I've Got a Reason. He also played in The Surfaris, with Jim Fuller, Jim Pash (Wipe Out), not Bob Berryhill’s spin off version of The Surfaris, off and on from 1982 until 2017.

References 

Love Song (band) members
Year of birth missing (living people)
Living people
Singers from California
People from Lynwood, California
Guitarists from California